Yaryna Matlo is a Paralympic swimmer from Ukraine competing mainly in category SB12 events.

Matlo competed as part of the Ukrainian Paralympic swimming team at the 2008 Summer Paralympics, where she won a bronze medal in the  breaststroke, finished eighth in the  butterfly but failed to make the final of the  individual medley.

References

External links
 

Year of birth missing (living people)
Living people
Ukrainian female breaststroke swimmers
Paralympic swimmers of Ukraine
Paralympic bronze medalists for Ukraine
Paralympic medalists in swimming
Swimmers at the 2008 Summer Paralympics
Swimmers at the 2012 Summer Paralympics
Swimmers at the 2020 Summer Paralympics
Medalists at the 2008 Summer Paralympics
Medalists at the 2012 Summer Paralympics
Medalists at the 2020 Summer Paralympics
S12-classified Paralympic swimmers
Medalists at the World Para Swimming Championships
Medalists at the World Para Swimming European Championships
Laureates of the Prize of the Cabinet of Ministers of Ukraine for special achievements of youth in the development of Ukraine
21st-century Ukrainian women